Manke Nelis (born Cornelis Pieters; 1919-1993) was a Dutch singer in the levenslied genre.

Career
Manke Nelis was born in Groenlo on 16 December 1919 and began his musical career as a bass player, often accompanying his brother-in-law, accordionist Johnny Meijer. In the 1950s he performed under the stage name Carlo Pietro and started singing the Amsterdam levenslied. A motorcycle accident in France and a subsequent medical error cost him a leg; he reportedly spent the more than 100,000 guilders he received as compensation within a year. His biggest hit was "Kleine Jodeljongen" in 1987.

In 1987 he narrowly survived a bus crash on an American tour with Dutch artists, near San Diego. He died of cancer 8 October 1993, at age 73.

Legacy
A statue of Manke Nelis was placed on the Johnny Jordaan Square off the Elandsgracht, in the company of statues for Johnny Jordaan, Tante Leen, and Johnny Meijer.

References

1919 births
1993 deaths
Dutch levenslied singers
Musicians from Amsterdam
20th-century Dutch male singers